Khetag Khugaev (born 21 October 1997) is a Russian weightlifter, competing in the 94 kg category until 2018 and 96 kg starting in 2018 after the International Weightlifting Federation reorganized the categories.

Career
In 2014, he competed at the 2014 Summer Youth Olympic Games in the 85 kg category, winning the gold medal.

At the 2015 European Weightlifting Championships he competed in the 94 kg category, winning a silver medal in the snatch, clean & jerk and total.

Major results

References

1997 births
Living people
Russian male weightlifters
Youth Olympic gold medalists for Russia
Weightlifters at the 2014 Summer Youth Olympics
European Weightlifting Championships medalists
20th-century Russian people
21st-century Russian people